The 1949 All-Ireland Minor Football Championship was the 18th staging of the All-Ireland Minor Football Championship, the Gaelic Athletic Association's premier inter-county Gaelic football tournament for boys under the age of 18.

Tyrone entered the championship as defending champions, however, they were defeated in the Ulster Championship.

On 25 September 1949, Armagh won the championship following a 1-7 to 1-5 defeat of Kerry in the All-Ireland final. This was their first All-Ireland title.

Results

Connacht Minor Football Championship

Munster Minor Football Championship

Leinster Minor Football Championship

Ulster Minor Football Championship

All-Ireland Minor Football Championship
Semi-Finals

Final

Championship statistics

Miscellaneous

 Sligo win the Connacht title for the first time in their history.

References

1949
All-Ireland Minor Football Championship